Temnida is a genus of spiders in the family Anyphaenidae. It was first described in 1896 by Simon.  it contains 2 species.

References

Anyphaenidae
Araneomorphae genera
Spiders of South America